Pieter Stephanus du Toit (born 20 August 1992) is a South African professional rugby union player. After winning the 2019 Rugby World Cup with South Africa, he was awarded the 2019 World Rugby Player of the Year.

School and youth career
Du Toit went to school at Hoërskool Swartland where he played mostly in the back row.

Du Toit was a member of the South Africa Under 20 team that won the 2012 IRB Junior World Championship.

Senior career
However, he did sign a further contract renewal and the Sharks announced his departure in October 2015.

He made his Springboks Test debut versus Wales in Cardiff on 9 November 2013 at age 21. Du Toit has since become a regular for the Springboks and was a part of the South African team for the 2015 Rugby World Cup. Du Toit came off the bench in the quarter final, where South Africa beat Wales, 23–19, at Twickenham Stadium. The following season saw Du Toit become a regular starter for South Africa, under new head coach, Allister Coetzee.

On 2 June 2018, Du Toit became the 60th captain of South Africa, as he led the Springboks out against Wales, losing the match 20–22. Du Toit also took part in the mid-year England series, which South Africa won.

He moved to the back row from 2019 onwards.

Du Toit was named in South Africa's squad for the 2019 Rugby World Cup. South Africa won the tournament, defeating England in the final. He was awarded the World Rugby Men's 15s Player of the Year in 2019.

International statistics

Test match record

Pld = Games Played, W = Games Won, D = Games Drawn, L = Games Lost, Tri = Tries Scored, Pts = Points Scored

Test tries

Personal life
Du Toit is the grandson of former Springbok prop, Piet "Spiere" du Toit and is the older brother of Johan, also a professional rugby player.

See also
 List of South Africa national rugby union players – Springbok no. 854

References

External links
 
 
 Sharks Profile

1992 births
Rugby union players from Cape Town
People from the Western Cape
Living people
South African rugby union players
Sharks (rugby union) players
Sharks (Currie Cup) players
Rugby union locks
Afrikaner people
South Africa international rugby union players
South Africa Under-20 international rugby union players